Gibbstown is an unincorporated community and census-designated place (CDP) located within Greenwich Township, in Gloucester County, New Jersey. As of the 2010 U.S. census, the CDP's population was 3,739.  Gibbstown is the location of C. A. Nothnagle Log House, purportedly the oldest house in New Jersey and the oldest surviving log house in the U.S., dating to around 1638.

Geography
According to the U.S. Census Bureau, Gibbstown had a total area of 1.642 square miles (4.253 km2), all of which was land.

The Port of Paulsboro is located on the Delaware River and Mantua Creek in and around Paulsboro. Traditionally one of the nation's busiest for marine transfer operations of petroleum products, including the Paulsboro Refinery, which is mostly located in Gibbstown. The port is being redeveloped as an adaptable omniport able to handle a diversity of  bulk, break bulk cargo and shipping containers. Studies completed in 2012 concluded that the port is well suited to become a center for the manufacture, assembly, and transport of wind turbines and platforms the development of Atlantic Wind Connection

Demographics

Census 2010

Census 2000
As of the 2000 U.S. census there were 3,758 people, 1,453 households, and 1,060 families living in the CDP. The population density was 890.2/km2 (2,302.4/mi2). There were 1,513 housing units at an average density of 358.4/km2 (927.0/mi2). The racial makeup of the CDP was 96.65% White, 1.09% African American, 0.11% Native American, 0.69% Asian, 0.03% Pacific Islander, 0.32% from other races, and 1.12% from two or more races. Hispanic or Latino of any race were 1.52% of the population.

There were 1,453 households, out of which 31.7% had children under the age of 18 living with them, 57.1% were married couples living together, 11.2% had a female householder with no husband present, and 27.0% were non-families. 23.3% of all households were made up of individuals, and 13.3% had someone living alone who was 65 years of age or older. The average household size was 2.58 and the average family size was 3.05.

In the CDP, the population was spread out, with 23.0% under the age of 18, 7.6% from 18 to 24, 28.1% from 25 to 44, 23.6% from 45 to 64, and 17.7% who were 65 years of age or older. The median age was 40 years. For every 100 females, there were 95.9 males. For every 100 females age 18 and over, there were 92.2 males.

The median income for a household in the CDP was $50,444, and the median income for a family was $59,833. Males had a median income of $41,200 versus $31,225 for females. The per capita income for the CDP was $23,931. About 1.2% of families and 3.2% of the population were below the poverty line, including 3.4% of those under age 18 and 4.9% of those age 65 or over.

Education
Greenwich Township School District operates the area public schools except high school, which is operated by Paulsboro Public Schools.

Guardian Angels Regional School is a K-8 school that operates under the auspices of the Roman Catholic Diocese of Camden. Its PreK-3 campus is in Gibbstown while its 4-8 campus is in Paulsboro.

Notable people

People who were born in, residents of, or otherwise closely associated with Gibbstown include:
 Sylvia Earle (born 1935), marine biologist, oceanographer and explorer.
Alex Silvestro (born 1988), former football tight end / defensive end who played in the NFL for the Baltimore Ravens and New England Patriots.

References

External links

Census-designated places in Gloucester County, New Jersey
Greenwich Township, Gloucester County, New Jersey
New Sweden